Brigadier Alan MacDougall Ritchie,  (25 June 1893 – 30 April 1964) was an officer in the British Army during the First and the Second World Wars.

Military career
Ritchie was educated at Highgate School and attended the Royal Military College, Sandhurst. During the First World War he was a captain in the Argyll and Sutherland Highlanders, was mentioned in despatches and awarded the Greek Order of the Redeemer.

Ritchie was appointed commanding officer of the 1st Battalion, Royal Scots from 1918 to 1919 and of the 1st Battalion, Argyll and Sutherland Highlanders in 1937. He was awarded a Distinguished Service Order for service in Palestine during in 1939, and became commander of the 26th (East Africa) Infantry Brigade and the 21st (East Africa) Infantry Brigade in the King's African Rifles during the East African Campaign. As commander of the 21st (East Africa) Brigade (11th African Division), Ritchie was detached to 1st South African Division from 27 February until 6 April and, thereafter, to the 12th African Division.

Later life
Ritchie was Assistant Commissioner in Chief of the St John Ambulance Brigade from 1950 to 1957 and was appointed an Officer of the Order of the British Empire in the 1958 Birthday Honours.

References

External links
Generals of World War II

1893 births
1964 deaths
Argyll and Sutherland Highlanders officers
British Army brigadiers of World War II
British Army personnel of World War I
British military personnel of the 1936–1939 Arab revolt in Palestine
Companions of the Distinguished Service Order
Graduates of the Royal Military College, Sandhurst
Officers of the Order of the British Empire
People educated at Highgate School